Dr. Heena Gavit is an Indian Bharatiya Janata Party politician from Maharashtra. She is a member of the 17th Lok Sabha (lower house of the Indian Parliament) from the Nandurbar constituency.She is a National Spokesperson of the BJP.

Professional career
Dr. Heena Gavit is the daughter of Dr Vijaykumar Gavit, a Bharatiya Janata Party & Ex-Nationalist Congress Party (NCP) MLA from the Nandurbar Assembly constituency. She is a doctor by profession.

Political career
In the 2014 Lok Sabha elections, she defeated Manikrao Hodlya Gavit, a nine-time MP from Nandurbar. Manikrao's Indian National Congress held the seat since 1981. Heena's victory of margin was 106905 votes.

Along with Raksha Khadse, she became the youngest MP in the 16th Lok Sabha.

Controversy
On 5 August 2018, the protesters who were observing a dharna outside the Dhule Collector's office for the past 16 days attacked Heena Gavit's car.

References

1987 births
Living people
People from Nandurbar district
Marathi politicians
India MPs 2014–2019
India MPs 2019–present
Women in Maharashtra politics
Indian women medical doctors
Lok Sabha members from Maharashtra
Bharatiya Janata Party politicians from Maharashtra
20th-century Indian medical doctors
21st-century Indian women politicians
21st-century Indian politicians
Medical doctors from Maharashtra
20th-century women physicians
Women members of the Lok Sabha
20th-century Indian women